Tyson Mao (born May 8, 1984, in San Francisco, California) is an American Rubik's Cube speedsolver. He is a co-founder and a former board member of the World Cube Association, an organization that holds competitive events for the Rubik's Cube.  In 2005, he set the world record for 3x3x3 blindfolded. In 2006, he appeared on the CW Television Network's Beauty and the Geek as one of the participants of the second incarnation of the reality television show.

Personal
Tyson Mao was born in San Francisco to immigrant parents from Tainan, Taiwan. He lives in the San Francisco Bay Area and previously used to work as a Poker Product Manager for Zynga. Mao graduated from the California Institute of Technology in 2006 with a degree in astrophysics. His father is a doctor based in South San Francisco.

In 2017, Mao opened the Wursthall Restaurant & Bierhaus in San Mateo, California with partners Adam Simpson and J. Kenji López-Alt.

Rubik's Cube
Tyson began solving the cube during the Rubik's Cube's second boom in 2003, first using a beginner's method, then the Petrus and Fridrich methods. Tyson is credited for popularizing the "Caltech move" for solving the three diagonal corner permutation in blindfold solving.

Competition Organizer
Tyson has been the main organizer of major U.S competitions, including all US Nationals up to 2013, as well as many Caltech competitions.

Tyson Mao's beginner method
Tyson Mao's unofficial beginner method is a set of 8 videos which can be viewed at Rubiks.com. This method is most famous for being used by Will Smith in a past film The Pursuit of Happyness, that was released in 2006. The method is basically a simplified layer-by-layer approach which works much the same way as the Fridrich method. The difference is that the cross is first built around the opposite side to simplify the permutation foresight required, the first two layers are permuted individually, the last layer requires an algorithm to construct a cross, and then repetition of Lars Petrus' Sune algorithm to orient, and finally permutation requires the use of two algorithms, one for the corners and one for the edges. These algorithms may have to be executed multiple times.

Media appearances
Beauty and the Geek Season 2
CNN's Anderson Cooper 360° (Air date: December 15, 2006)
Identity
The Tonight Show with Jay Leno (Air date: January 27, 2006)
Twins
USA Network: Show Us Your Character
Good Morning America (Air date: February 4, 2008)

References

External links

 Brothers square off in cubing contest, San Francisco Chronicle

Tyson's Blog

1984 births
American people of Chinese descent
American people of Taiwanese descent
American speedcubers
California Institute of Technology alumni
Living people
Participants in American reality television series
People from San Francisco